This is a list of episodes for the third season of Alice.

Broadcast history
The season originally aired Sundays at 9:30-10:00 pm (EST) from September 24 to October 8, 1978, at 8:30-9:00 pm (EST) from October 15, 1978 to February 25, 1979 and at 9:00-9:30 pm (EST) from March 11 to April 1, 1979.

Episodes

References

1978 American television seasons
1979 American television seasons